Mingde Dam is a rockfill dam across the Laotianliao River in central Touwu Township, Miaoli County, Taiwan. The Mingde Reservoir ( Míngdé Shuǐkù) behind the dam serves mainly for irrigation and municipal water supply for Miaoli City.

History
The dam was built in 1966–1970.

See also
List of dams and reservoirs in Taiwan

References

1970 establishments in Taiwan
Dams completed in 1970
Dams in Miaoli County
Rock-filled dams